A crime family is a unit of an organized crime syndicate, particularly in Italian organized crime and especially in the Sicilian Mafia and Italian American Mafia, often operating within a specific geographic territory or a specific set of activities. In its strictest sense, a family (or clan) is a criminal gang, operating either on a unitary basis or as an organized collection of smaller gangs (e.g., cells, factions, crews, etc.).  In turn, a family can be a sole "enterprise" or part of a larger syndicate or cartel. Despite the name, most crime families are generally not based on or formed around actual familial connections, although they do tend to be ethnically-based, and many members may in fact be related to one another.

Origins
The origins of the term come from the Sicilian Mafia. In the Sicilian language, the word cosca, which is the crown of spiny, closely folded leaves on plants such as the artichoke or the thistle, symbolizes the tightness of relationships between members.  The word cosca is also used for clan. In the early days of the Mafia, loose groups of bandits organized themselves into associations that over time became more organized, and they adopted the term based on both of its meanings.

As the Mafia was imported into the United States in the late 19th century, the English translation of the word cosca was more at clan or family.

The term can be a point of confusion, especially in popular culture and Hollywood, because in the truest sense, crime families are not necessarily blood families who happen to be involved in criminal activity, and they are not necessarily based on blood relationships. In Sicily and America, most Mafia bosses are not related to their predecessors. Films like The Godfather and a spate of late-1980s "Mafia princess" television movies underscore this confusion.

It can further be speculated that the Mafia was simply emulating, to a certain degree, a more medieval order in which a noble family would more or less serve as the power in a local village, in a sort of inverted hacienda culture.

The Calabrian 'Ndrangheta is, however, purported to be organized along familial lines as 'ndrine.

Nevertheless, the term stuck, both in the minds of popular culture as well as the national law enforcement community, and eventually began to be used to describe individual units of not only Sicilian gangsters, but those whose origins lie in other parts of Italy (e.g., the aforementioned 'Ndrangheta, the Neapolitan Camorra, the Apulian Sacra Corona Unita, etc.).  Indeed, the "family" mystique is to such a great degree that in the late 1990s, after many Camorra leaders were imprisoned during a large-scale crackdown in Naples, many of their wives, girlfriends, daughters, and even mothers took temporary control of their gangs, in a widespread phenomenon of Camorra "godmothers".

Sometimes the term is used to describe distinct units of crime syndicates of other ethnic and national origin, such as the Irish Mob, Japanese Yakuza, Chinese Tongs and Triads, Indian mafia, Colombian and Mexican drug cartels, Albanian mafia, Russian mafia, Maltese mafia , the Thief in law and Eastern European families. Some of these entities, like the 'Ndrangheta, may also be organized along blood-family lines.

Crime families

See also
 Crime lord
 Drug cartel
 Drug lord
 Gun moll
 List of crime bosses
 List of criminal enterprises, gangs and syndicates
 Mafia
 Organized crime

Footnotes

Bibliography
Gambetta, Diego (2009). Codes of the Underworld. Princeton University Press. 

Family